The Andorra women's national under-18 basketball team is a national basketball team of Andorra, administered by the Andorran Basketball Federation. It represents the country in women's international under-18 basketball competitions.

The team won five medals at the FIBA U18 Women's European Championship Division C.

See also
Andorra women's national basketball team
Andorra women's national under-16 basketball team
Andorra men's national under-18 basketball team

References

External links
Archived records of Andorra team participations

Basketball in Andorra
Women's national under-18 basketball teams
Basketball